Parta  may refer to:
 Parta, Vršac, a village in Serbia
 Parta, Tibet, a village in Tibet
 Parța, a commune of Romania

PARTA  may refer to:
Pacific Islands Forum, an inter-governmental organization of countries in the Pacific Ocean
Portage Area Regional Transportation Authority, a public transit authority in Portage County, Ohio

See also 
 Partha (disambiguation)